Norsewood is a small rural settlement in the Tararua District and Manawatū-Whanganui region of New Zealand's North Island. The town is situated east of the Ruahine Mountain range and is located 20 kilometres northeast of Dannevirke.

Geography

The Norsewood area, as defined by Statistics New Zealand, covers 397.35 km², including the township and the surrounding rural hinterland.

The source of the Manawatu River is located behind the settlement, at the end of Manawatu River Road, forming the natural boundary for the region and Hawke's Bay to the north.

The village consists of two parts. Upper Norsewood features the town's main road, Coronation Street, a gift shop, a visitor's centre and a Pioneer Museum housed in an 1888 building. Lower Norsewood, located 1 km to the south, features Hovding Street and Norsewear, a company which provides woolen garments in Norwegian designs.

Upper and Lower Norsewood lie on either side of State Highway 2.

History

Early settlement

Norsewood was founded by mainly Norwegian settlers in 1872 as a loggers’ settlement and retains a Scandinavian tenor. The village was carved out of the forest, and was subsequently destroyed in a fire in 1888.

The government of New Zealand requested Norwegian immigrants and made an agreement with Winge & Co. in Christiania, which would allow for 3,000 emigrants to New Zealand. In the years 1870–76, nearly 1,000 Norwegians moved to the Norsewood area.

Modern township

The settlement continues celebrate its Scandinavian culture. A Scandinavian festival is held every year. Traditional celebrations of Norway's Constitution Day is held on the Sunday closest to 17 May.

The main square by Coronation Street welcomes visitors to "Little Norway", and a Norwegian flag flies from the street's tourist office. The Bindalsfaering, a fishing boat gifted by the Norwegian Government, is displayed in a glassed boat-house in Upper Norsewood, near a replica of a Norwegian stave church.

Demography

The population of Norsewood settlement was 135 in the 2018 New Zealand census, an increase of 24 (21.6%) since the 2013 census, and a decrease of 3 (-2.2%) since the 2006 census. There were 75 males and 57 females, giving a sex ratio of 1.32 males per female. Ethnicities were 117 people  (86.7%) European/Pākehā, 36 (26.7%) Māori, 3 (2.2%) Pacific peoples, and 3 (2.2%) Asian (totals add to more than 100% since people could identify with multiple ethnicities). Of the total population, 27 people  (20.0%) were under 15 years old, 24 (17.8%) were 15–29, 63 (46.7%) were 30–64, and 21 (15.6%) were over 65.

Norsewood statistical area

Norsewood had a population of 1,611 at the 2018 New Zealand census, an increase of 63 people (4.1%) since the 2013 census, and an increase of 66 people (4.3%) since the 2006 census. There were 615 households. There were 843 males and 768 females, giving a sex ratio of 1.1 males per female. The median age was 44.1 years (compared with 37.4 years nationally), with 342 people (21.2%) aged under 15 years, 243 (15.1%) aged 15 to 29, 768 (47.7%) aged 30 to 64, and 261 (16.2%) aged 65 or older.

Ethnicities were 90.9% European/Pākehā, 19.9% Māori, 1.5% Pacific peoples, 0.9% Asian, and 0.7% other ethnicities (totals add to more than 100% since people could identify with multiple ethnicities).

The proportion of people born overseas was 7.8%, compared with 27.1% nationally.

Although some people objected to giving their religion, 51.6% had no religion, 35.8% were Christian, 0.2% were Buddhist and 3.7% had other religions.

Of those at least 15 years old, 150 (11.8%) people had a bachelor or higher degree, and 315 (24.8%) people had no formal qualifications. The median income was $30,700, compared with $31,800 nationally. The employment status of those at least 15 was that 645 (50.8%) people were employed full-time, 228 (18.0%) were part-time, and 39 (3.1%) were unemployed.

Economy

In 2018, 14.1% of the workforce worked in manufacturing, 3.4% worked in construction, 0.0% worked in retail and wholesale, 2.4% worked in hospitality, 2.8% worked in transport, 6.6% worked in education, and 6.9% worked in healthcare.

Crown Hotel is a local pub and meeting place.

Transport

As of 2018, among those who commute to work, 63.1% drove a car, 1.4% rode in a car, 0.3% use a bike, and 0.3% walk or run. No one commuted by public transport.

Education

In popular culture

The town appears in the television series The Almighty Johnsons, where some of its descendants are the reincarnations of Norse gods.

References

External links

 Former Norsewood Official Website
 Norsewood Cemetery
 Former Norsewood Ship profile
 Former District Information Page

New Zealand–Norway relations
Populated places in Manawatū-Whanganui
Tararua District
Norwegian New Zealander